Oskar Zwimpfer (date of birth unknown) was a Swiss footballer who played for as midfielder in the early 1900s.

Football career
Zwimpfer played in FC Basel's reserve team, who at that time played in the second tier of Swiss football. He joined the first team for their 1905–06 season. According to the existing documentation, Zwimpfer played his domestic league debut for the club in the away game on 11 March 1906 as Basel were defeated 0–2 by FC Bern.

In his one season with their first team, Zwimpfer played at least five games for Basel without scoring a goal. At least two of these games were in the Swiss Serie A and the others were friendly games, including a 5–2 away win against AC Milan. He probably played more games than mentioned, but the documentation is not available.

Notes

Incomplete league matches 1905–1906 season: FCB-OB, FCB-Bern, YB-FCB, FCB-YB

References

Sources
 Rotblau: Jahrbuch Saison 2017/2018. Publisher: FC Basel Marketing AG. 
 Die ersten 125 Jahre. Publisher: Josef Zindel im Friedrich Reinhardt Verlag, Basel. 
 Verein "Basler Fussballarchiv" Homepage

FC Basel players
Swiss men's footballers
Association football midfielders
Swiss Super League players
Date of birth missing
Date of death missing